John McLiam (born John Williams; January 24, 1918 – April 16, 1994) was a film and television actor noted for his skill at different accents. His film appearances include My Fair Lady (1964), In Cold Blood (1967), John Frankenheimer's movie of The Iceman Cometh (1973), The Missouri Breaks (1976), and First Blood (1982). He was a guest star in numerous television series and wrote a Broadway play, The Sin of Pat Muldoon.

Early life
He attended St. Mary's College of California (Moraga, California). During World War II he served in the United States Navy as an intelligence officer, having received a Bronze Star. After the war he worked briefly as a journalist for the San Francisco Examiner.

Acting career

He took McLiam, the Gaelic form of his real surname Williams, as a stage name.

His acting career began in Maxwell Anderson's Winterset in San Francisco in 1946. After a few roles in plays in California he moved to New York. His first Broadway role was as a guard in Maxwell Anderson's Barefoot in Athens in 1951. His other stage roles include Shaw's Saint Joan, and Tiger at the Gates, Christopher Fry's version of a Jean Giraudoux play, which ran 1959–60 on Broadway. He appeared in the original Broadway cast of One More River (1960).

He moved to California in 1960 to work in film and television. His film roles included a cockney ne'er-do-well in My Fair Lady (1964), Boss Kean in Cool Hand Luke (1967), In Cold Blood (1967) as murder victim Herbert Clutter, John acted as the pilot/flight instructor for Aunt Bee in Season 8 of The Andy Griffith Show, "Aunt Bee's Big Moment" Halls of Anger (1970), Woody Allen's Sleeper (1973), rancher David Braxton in The Missouri Breaks (1976), and Orval in First Blood (1982). He played Jimmy Tomorrow in John Frankenheimer's American Film Theater movie of The Iceman Cometh (1973), alongside Fredric March, Lee Marvin, Robert Ryan and Jeff Bridges.

He was John of Gaunt in William Woodman's filmed version of Shakespeare's Richard II (1982): while the cast's acting was generally judged as poor, Charles R. Forker said McLiam delivered Gaunt's most famous speech "like an operatic aria" but in general was no match for Sir John Gielgud at speaking verse.

McLiam portrayed Ellis Carter, a young man seeking freedom from his domineering brother, in the 1961 episode "The Big Spender" of the television series Window on Main Street. 

In 1964, he guest starred on Gunsmoke as a helpful crazy farmer named “Delphos” in the episode “Big Man, Big Target” (S10/E10).  In 1966 he returned in “My Father, My Son” (S11E30) as an Irish drunkard named “Dougherty”, then again as “Dougherty” on “Champion of the World” (S12E14), and as "O'Quillian" (S14E06).

In the 1979 television miniseries  Freedom Road, he played Ulysses S. Grant. He appeared in several episodes of the western series The Virginian (one of which was in 1970 as Parker on "The Men From Shiloh" which was the rebranded name that year for The Virginian) and Gunsmoke, and was Doc Holliday in the pilot of Bret Maverick. He portrayed Elsworth Chisolm in two episodes of Dynasty, and the lead character's father in T.J. Hooker. In 1980, he played retired attorney Nathan Moore in an episode during the final season of The Waltons. He guest starred in Little House on the Prairie in 1983, and he appeared in a 1986 episode of Highway to Heaven as an angel opposite Michael Landon.  He had guest roles in dozens of other television series, including The Twilight Zone, Gunsmoke, The Andy Griffith Show and Perry Mason.

Writing
His play The Sin of Pat Muldoon, about a Roman Catholic family, ran for five performances from March 13 to 16, 1957 at the Cort Theatre on Broadway. The central character, played in that production by James Barton, is a father who renounces his faith following the death of his son and spends his savings on partying and loose women before having a heart attack. Though he attempts to resolve some of his family's problems, he dies unrepentant. Playwright and producer Maxwell Anderson, given the script to consider producing it, condemned the play as lying on well-trampled ground following Seán O'Casey's Juno and the Paycock, declaring, "I've grown weary of the whole subject. An ancient, irritable, blasphemous, dying but loveable Irishman says his last ten thousand words and goes to his own place. The hell with him."

Personal life
McLiam and his wife Roberta had a daughter, Claire. He died in Woodland Hills, Los Angeles, California in 1994 from melanoma and Parkinson's disease.

Selected filmography

1957: Decoy as Mike, and as Father Kelly
1961: Dead to the World as Goody
1964: My Fair Lady as Harry (uncredited)
1965: Honey West (TV Series) as Gordon
1967: Cool Hand Luke as Boss Kean
1967: In Cold Blood as Herbert Clutter
1968: Madigan as Dunne (uncredited)
1968: Riverrun as Jeffries
1968: The Andy Griffith Show (TV Series) as Mac
1969: The Reivers as Van Tosch
1970: Halls of Anger as Boyd Wilkerson
1970: R. P. M. as Reverend Blauvelt
1970: Monte Walsh as Joe 'Fightin' Joe' Hooker
1971: Big Jake as Army Officer (uncredited)
1972: The Culpepper Cattle Co. as Thorton Pierce
1973: Showdown as F.J. Wilson
1973: The Iceman Cometh as Jimmy Tomorrow
1973: Sleeper as Dr. Agon
1974: The Dove as Lyle Graham
1975: Rafferty and the Gold Dust Twins as John Beachwood
1975: Bite the Bullet as Gebhardt
1975: Lucky Lady as Rass Huggins
1976: The Missouri Breaks as David Braxton
1976: The Food of the Gods as Mr. Skinner
1979: Freedom Road as President Ulysses S. Grant
1982: The End of August as Colonel
1982: First Blood as Orval Kellerman
1982: Voyager from the Unknown as Dr. Bernard
1987: Walk Like a Man as H.P. Truman
1988: Split Decisions as Pop McGuinn

References

External links
 
 

Male actors from Alberta
1918 births
1994 deaths
Canadian male film actors
Canadian male television actors
Deaths from melanoma
Deaths from Parkinson's disease
Deaths from cancer in California
Neurological disease deaths in California
20th-century Canadian male actors
Saint Mary's College of California alumni
United States Navy personnel of World War II
San Francisco Examiner people
Burials at Santa Barbara Cemetery
Canadian emigrants to the United States